Qaradəmirçi (also, Karadamirchi and Karademirchi) is a village and municipality in the Barda Rayon of Azerbaijan.  It has a population of 456.

References

See also
Birinci Qaradəmirçi 
İkinci Qaradəmirçi 

Populated places in Barda District